Jerry Spinelli (born February 1, 1941) is an American writer of children's novels that feature adolescence and early adulthood. His novels include Maniac Magee, Stargirl, and Wringer.

Life 
Spinelli was born in Norristown, Pennsylvania, and currently lives in Phoenixville, Pennsylvania. At the age of 16, his love of sports inspired him to compose a poem about a recent football victory, which his father published in the local newspaper without his knowledge. It was at this time he realized that he would not become a major league baseball player, so he decided to become a writer.

At Gettysburg College, Spinelli spent his time writing short stories and was the editor of the college literary magazine, The Mercury. After graduation, he became a writer and editor for a department store magazine. The next two decades, he spent his time working "normal jobs" during the day so that he had the energy to write fiction in his free time. He found himself writing during lunch breaks, on weekends, and after dinner.

His first few novels were written for adults and were all rejected. His fifth novel was also intended for adults but became his first children's book. This work, Space Station Seventh Grade, was published in 1982.

Spinelli graduated from Gettysburg College in 1963 and acquired his MA from Johns Hopkins University in 1964. In 1977, he married Eileen Mesi, another children's writer. Since about 1980, as Eileen Spinelli, she has collaborated with illustrators to create dozens of picture books. They have six children and 21 grandchildren.

Works

In culture

George Plimpton related an anecdote about Spinelli having bought at auction an evening with the Plimptons, in New York City, during which George Plimpton introduced Spinelli to writers and editors dining at Elaine's, and two months after which Spinelli wrote Plimpton to announce the publication of Spinelli's first book (a children's book) by Houghton Mifflin.

See also

References

External links

 
 
  (every one names an illustrator)
 The Papers of Jerry Spinelli are held in Gettysburg College's Special Collections & Archives. The collection includes manuscripts 1961–2003 as well as other materials. 

1941 births
American children's writers
American young adult novelists
Newbery Medal winners
Newbery Honor winners
Gettysburg College alumni
Johns Hopkins University alumni
American writers of Italian descent
People from Norristown, Pennsylvania
Novelists from Pennsylvania
Living people
American male novelists